Monguí is a town and municipality in Boyacá Department, Colombia, part of the Sugamuxi Province a subregion of Boyaca.

It was founded in 1601.

Monguí was named a Pueblo Patrimonio (heritage town) of Colombia in 2010. It is among 11 municipalities nationwide that were selected to be part of the Red Turística de Pueblos Patrimonio original cohort.

Notes

Municipalities of Boyacá Department
Populated places established in 1601